The third season of the Canadian police drama Rookie Blue starring Missy Peregrym, Ben Bass and Gregory Smith premiered on May 24, 2012 on Global in Canada.

Production
On July 13, 2011 ABC and Global announced that Rookie Blue had been renewed for a third season of thirteen episodes. William Shatner guest starred in the season premiere as a drunk driver. Peter Mooney plays new rookie, Nick Collins.

Peter Mooney joined the main cast as Officer Nick Collins, whilst recurring actor Melanie Nicholls-King was promoted to main cast. Noam Jenkins departed the main cast during season 3, whilst this was also the first season not to feature Eric Johnson in a starring role. Instead, he returned for several guest appearances.

Cast

Main Cast 
 Missy Peregrym as Officer Andy McNally
 Gregory Smith as Officer Dov Epstein
 Enuka Okuma as Detective Traci Nash
 Travis Milne as Officer Chris Diaz 
 Charlotte Sullivan as Officer Gail Peck
 Peter Mooney as Officer Nick Collins
 Noam Jenkins as Detective Jerry Barber
 Matt Gordon as Officer Oliver Shaw
 Lyriq Bent as Sergeant Frank Best
 Melanie Nicholls-King as Officer Noelle Williams
 Ben Bass as Officer Sam Swarek

Recurring 
 Eric Johnson as Detective Luke Callaghan

Episodes

U.S. Nielsen ratings
The following is a table for the United States ratings, based on average total estimated viewers per episode, of Rookie Blue on ABC.

References

External links
  for Global
  for ABC
 
 
 List of Rookie Blue episodes at The Futon Critic
 List of Rookie Blue episodes at MSN TV

2012 Canadian television seasons